Colonel Edmund Baron Hartley VC CMG (6 May 1847 – 20 March 1919) was a recipient of the Victoria Cross, the highest and most prestigious award for gallantry in the face of the enemy that can be awarded to British and Commonwealth forces.

Early life
Hartley was born in Ivybridge, Devon, England, on 6 May 1847. Hartley arrived in Basutoland from Cape Town in 1875, becoming the first district surgeon in the colony. He was based in Maseru, but frequently traveled across the colony to treat patients. Following the outbreak of the 1879 Morosi's Revolt he served as the principal medical officer of the Cape Colonial Forces. During the course of the campaign he organised his principal hospital at Fort Hartley on the Orange River. He distinguished himself during the campaign earning the Victoria Cross (VC) for his actions. Which bore the following citation:

On 5 June 1879 in South Africa, Surgeon Major Hartley attended the wounded under fire at the unsuccessful attack at Morosi's Mountain. From an exposed position, on open ground, he carried in his arms a wounded corporal of the Cape Mounted Riflemen. The surgeon major then returned under severe enemy fire in order to dress the wounds of the other men of the storming party.

Hartley continued his service as the principal medical officer of the Cape troops during the subsequent Basuto Gun War.

Later service

He later achieved the rank of surgeon colonel and, in March 1900 during the Second Boer War fighting at Aliwal, he is mentioned doing ambulance work, ferrying away the wounded under fire.

In November 1900 he was reported wounded following the occupation of Philippolis by Lovat Scouts and Seaforth Highlanders

On 19 April 1901 he was appointed a companion of the Order of St Michael and St George He died in Ash, Hampshire and is buried at Brookwood Cemetery.

The Medal
In 1955 the Victoria Cross medal was bought at Sotheby's for the then record price of £300. It is now displayed at the Army Medical Services Museum in Mytchett, Surrey.

References

External links
 Location of grave and VC medal (Brookwood Cemetery)
 The Brookwood Cemetery Society (Known Holders of the Victoria Cross Commemorated in Brookwood Cemetery)
 Image of Edmund Barron Hartley aged 12 (Named and dated photograph)
 BMJ obituary

1847 births
1919 deaths
People from Ivybridge
Burials at Brookwood Cemetery
Companions of the Order of St Michael and St George
British recipients of the Victoria Cross
British military personnel of the Second Boer War
People of the Basuto Gun War
Cape Colony army officers
British military personnel of the Anglo-Zulu War
British Army regimental surgeons
Royal Army Medical Corps officers
Military personnel from Devon